Streptomyces griseoruber is a bacterium species from the genus of Streptomyces which has been isolated from soil in Japan. Streptomyces griseoruber produces beromycin, actinomycin D, gombapyrone A, gombapyrone B, gombapyrone C, gombapyrone D and rhodomycins

Further reading

See also 
 List of Streptomyces species

References

External links
Type strain of Streptomyces griseoruber at BacDive -  the Bacterial Diversity Metadatabase

griseoruber
Bacteria described in 1955